The  is a multi-purpose stadium in Miyazaki, Japan. It is used mostly for baseball games. It hosted one NPB All-Star Game in 2006.

Baseball venues in Japan
Miyazaki (city)
Multi-purpose stadiums in Japan
Sports venues in Miyazaki Prefecture